Peter McGrail (born 31 May 1996) is a British professional boxer who as an amateur won gold at the 2018 Commonwealth Games.

Amateur career
In 2014, he won bronze medals in the Youth Olympic Games and World Youth Championships. He won the 2016 Amateur Boxing Association British featherweight title.

In 2015, he won silver in the EUBC European Confederation U22 Boxing Championships. 

In 2017, he became European champion and went on to claim bronze in the World Championships. and the following year in 2018, he won the gold medal in the Commonwealth Games held in the Gold Coast.

In 2019, McGrail was selected to compete at the European Games in Minsk, Belarus. He also competed at the World Championships in Yekaterinburg, Russia, where he won the bronze medal after losing by split decision (4:1) to Lázaro Álvarez in the semifinals.

He represented Great Britain at the 2020 Summer Olympics, but was eliminated in the preliminary round of 32.

Professional boxing record

References

External links

 
 
 
 

1996 births
Living people
British male boxers
English male boxers
Featherweight boxers
Olympic boxers of Great Britain
Boxers at the 2020 Summer Olympics
Boxers at the 2014 Summer Youth Olympics
Commonwealth Games medallists in boxing
Commonwealth Games gold medallists for England
Boxers at the 2018 Commonwealth Games
European Games bronze medalists for Great Britain
European Games medalists in boxing
Boxers at the 2019 European Games
AIBA World Boxing Championships medalists
Boxers from Liverpool
Medallists at the 2018 Commonwealth Games